The 2022 Great Lakes Intercollegiate Athletic Conference men's basketball tournament is a postseason men's basketball tournament for the GLIAC of the 2021–22 NCAA Division II men's basketball season which is taking place between March 2–6, 2022. Following the conclusion of the Quarterfinals, the GLIAC announced that the Semifinals and Championship game would be hosted by Michigan Tech in Houghton, Michigan.

Davenport defeated Northern Michigan 100–67 in the championship game to win their first GLIAC tournament title in school history. As a result of the win, they received the conference's automatic bid to the NCAA DII tournament.

Seeds
The top eight teams in the GLIAC, based on conference win percentage, will participate in the 2022 GLIAC Tournament.

Schedule

*Game times in Eastern Time. #Rankings denote tournament seeding.

Bracket

Game summaries

Quarterfinals

Semifinals

Championship

References

College basketball tournaments in Michigan
GLIAC Conference men's basketball tournament
GLIAC men's basketball tournament
Houghton, Michigan